Philip of Flanders may refer to:

 Philip I, Count of Flanders (1143-1191)
 Prince Philippe, Count of Flanders (1837-1905)